Ramakrishna Mission Temple, Dhaka is a historically significant architectural monument situated by the Buriganga River at Mitford area in old Dhaka, Bangladesh. The temple Ramakrishna Mission is an architecture which was founded by Swami Vivekananda in 1899 and the Ramakrishna Math (temple) was founded by Swami Brahmananda and Swami Premananda.

History
In 1916 Swami Brahmananda and Swami Premananda visited to Dhaka. On 13 February 1916, Swami Brahamananda and Swami Permananda laid the foundation of Ramakrishna Math and Ramakrishna Mission, respectively. After 8 months, on 24 October the first Governor of the East Bengal, Lord Carmichael, inaugurated the opening ceremony of the medical service centre. In March of this year, Dhaka Ramakrishna Mission received the affiliation of the Headquarters at Belur.

The Ramakrishna Mission Authority of Belur appointed the local executive committee to start renovation work as after 85 years of use, the temple had become dilapidated. The main construction work began in 2000. In 2015, Prime Minister of India, Narendra Modi visited them temple.

Architectural significance
The temple has a capacity of sitting for about 600 persons. It has 5 entrances. The shrine room with hexagonal view has been made in such a way that devotees can see the shrine from every side of the temple except back. The main dome is surrounding by 6 small domes with the symbols of 6 religions in their pinnacles, presenting the universality of Ramakrishna Order on the basis of Sri Ramakrishna's realization "as many faiths so many paths."

References

Sources
 Uddipon (Page no- 185- 230)published by: PrincipalRamakrishna Math and Ramakrishna Mission

External links
 

Old Dhaka
Monuments and memorials in Bangladesh
Ramakrishna Mission
Hindu temples in Dhaka
1916 establishments in British India